Black Out is a 2012 Dutch crime action comedy film.

Plot

Jos Vreeswijk (Thiry) is a former criminal who wakes up one day before his wedding to find a murdered corpse beside him, and no recollection of the night before.

Cast
 Raymond Thiry as Jos Vreeswijk
 Kim van Kooten as Caroline
 Bas Keijzer as Bobbie
 Renée Fokker as Coca Inez
 Edmond Classen as Charles
 Katja Schuurman as Charity
 Birgit Schuurman as Petra
 Willie Wartaal as Wally
 Kempi as Björn
 Simon Armstrong as Vlad
 Ursul de Geer as Rudolf
 Alex van Warmerdam as André
 Marwan Kenzari as Youssef
 Robert de Hoog as Gianni
 Horace Cohen as Rex
 Semmy Schilt as Abel

Reception
On review aggregator Rotten Tomatoes, the film holds an approval rating of 45% based on 11 reviews, with an average rating of 5.17/10.

Awards
Rembrandt Awards 2013 Nominee - Best Film
Rembrandt Awards 2013 Nominee - Best Actor, Raymond Thiry
Netherlands Film Festival Golden Calf 2013 Nominee - Best Supporting Actor, Bas Keijzer
Netherlands Film Festival Golden Calf 2013 Nominee - Best Cinematography, Jeroen de Bruin

References

External links
 
 

2012 films
2010s crime comedy films
Films based on Dutch novels
2012 crime action films
Dutch crime comedy films
2010s Dutch-language films
Films shot in the Netherlands
Films set in the Netherlands
Films directed by Arne Toonen
2012 comedy films